Slovenský rozhlas ("Slovak Radio") or SRo was a state-owned nationwide public-service radio broadcaster in Slovakia. It was headquartered in Bratislava in a building shaped like an inverted pyramid.

History

SRo began broadcasting from Bratislava, then in Czechoslovakia, twice per week on 3 August 1926 and then daily from 2 October 1926. The broadcaster also managed the Slovak Radio Children's Choir, founded in 1953, and the Slovak Radio Symphony Orchestra (SOSR), founded in 1929 as the Czechoslovak Radio Symphony Orchestra.

As a means to improve the finances of the state-owned public television broadcaster Slovenská televízia (Slovak Television), on 1 January 2011 SRo merged with Slovenská televízia to create Rozhlas a televízia Slovenska (Radio and Television of Slovakia).

SRo was a full member of the European Broadcasting Union between 1993 and 2011.

Channels

When merged with Slovenská televízia in 2011, SRo operated nine radio channels, all of which were continued as a part of Rozhlas a televízia Slovenska. 
SRo 1: 
SRo 2: 
SRo 3: 
SRo 4: Rádio FM
SRo 5:  
SRo 6: Radio Slovakia International

The following were digital-only channels:
SRo 7:  (classical music)
SRo 8:  (drama)
SRo 9:  (for children up to age 10)

See also
 Radio and Television Slovakia, SRo's successor
 List of radio stations in Slovakia
 Slovak Radio Symphony Orchestra

References

External links

About the Slovak Radio Building

European Broadcasting Union members
Publicly funded broadcasters
Radio stations in Slovakia
Radio stations established in 1926
Mass media in Bratislava
1926 establishments in Slovakia
Companies disestablished in 2011
State media
2011 disestablishments in Slovakia
Defunct mass media in Slovakia